Saint-Léger is a commune in the Mayenne department and Pays de la Loire region of France.

Geography
The Vaige has its source in the commune and forms part of its south-western border.

See also
Communes of the Mayenne department

References

Saintleger